Naples is an unincorporated area in Santa Barbara County, California, United States on the south portion of the Gaviota Coast.

Dos Pueblos refers to two Chumash villages that existed when in 1542 explorer Juan Rodríguez Cabrillo wrote about seeing them. The villages of Kuya'mu and Mikiw were across the creek from each other.  A subdivision map was filed to create a community but the parcels were not developed.

References

Unincorporated communities in California
Unincorporated communities in Santa Barbara County, California